Kayla Pratt (born 27 May 1991) is a New Zealand rower. She won the gold medal in the coxless four at the 2014 World Rowing Championships in Amsterdam. With the women's eight, she came fourth at the 2016 Rio Olympics.

References

External links
 

1991 births
Living people
New Zealand female rowers
Rowers from Auckland
World Rowing Championships medalists for New Zealand
Rowers at the 2016 Summer Olympics
Olympic rowers of New Zealand
People educated at Epsom Girls' Grammar School
21st-century New Zealand women